Stephen J. Bush is a Welsh actor who started his professional career in early 2000 with a series of comedy sketches on the BBC Choice Wales show Sleeping Dogs. These sketches were later seen and commissioned as a series by the then new BBC Choice/BBC Three controller Stuart Murphy.

Films/TV
Green Zone - directed by Paul Greengrass (2009)
Holby City - directed by Sarah O'Gorman - BBC (2007)
Atonement - directed by Joe Wright (2006)
Flyboys - directed by Tony Bill - MGM (2006)
Bad Girls - directed by Barnaby Southcombe - ITV (2006)
Crimesolver - directed by Sara Allen - BBC Wales (2005)
Fried - BBC 2W (2002)
Sleeping Dogs - produced by Tom Law - BBC Choice Wales (2000/01)
Star Stories Episode 1 - directed by Elliot Hegarty - Channel 4 (2006)
Forgiven aka Stand By Your Man - directed by Paul Wilmshurst - More 4 (2007)
Tastebuddies - directed by Tim Williamson - BBC Choice (2000)
The Welsh Great Escape - directed by Michael Davies - Channel 4 (2003)
Vital Signs - directed by Charles Palmer - ITV (2006)

External links
https://actors.mandy.com/uk/view.php?uid=116848
http://www.bbc.co.uk/pressoffice/pressreleases/stories/2005/06_june/14/crimesolver.shtml
http://www.hartswoodfilms.co.uk/programmes/doc_welsh.html

Living people
Year of birth missing (living people)
Welsh male film actors
Welsh male television actors